Vinzaglio is a Turin Metro station, located near the intersection between Corso Vinzaglio, Corso Vittorio Emanuele II and Corso Duca degli Abruzzi. It was part of the Line 1 extension from XVIII Dicembre to Porta Nuova opened on 5 October 2007.

The platforms feature decals by Ugo Nespolo, depicting historic moments of the Risorgimento, such as the Battle of Vinzaglio (1859).

Services
 Ticket vending machines
 Handicap accessibility
 Elevators
 Escalators
 Active CCTV surveillance

References

Turin Metro stations
Railway stations opened in 2007
2007 establishments in Italy
Railway stations in Italy opened in the 21st century